Clive Barker (June 29, 1931 – March 17, 2005) was a theater performer, acting coach and a co-editor of New Theatre Quarterly.

Theater Professional 
Clive Barker was born in Middlesbrough, his father was a steel worker. He trained to be a stage manager at the Bristol Old Vic School and joined Joan Littlewood's theater group afterward. Important roles were in Brendan Behan’s The Hostage (1958) and Oh! What a Lovely War (1963). His debut as a director was Shelagh Delaney’s The Lion in Love (1960). At the end of this career, he had become an "innovative spirit at the heart of theatre studies", according to the obituary in The Guardian.

He bridged the gap between the professional theater and theater studies at British universities; many previous theater scholars (among them Allardyce Nicoll) had called for well-versed academics who had practical experience as theater artists. Barker's actor training book, Theatre Games (1977), was based on the model of the scholar/clown and grew to be very influential among theater practitioners and teachers in many countries. The manual includes advice, instructions for games, and theories of performance; it enjoyed frequent citation for decades. The book's success led to Barker teaching acting courses "at the highest levels" internationally. The book's method was attractive to those working in conventional and alternative theater. Barker himself was devoted to unconventional forms of theater. His last professional service was, on the day he died, instructing a group of children with cerebral palsy.

Academic career 
Barker's career in university teaching, academic publishing, and theater research stretched over decades. In 1967 he joined the Drama Department at Birmingham University, moving on to Warwick University’s Theatre Studies Department in 1976. He retired in 1993. For 25 years, he was a co-editor of Theatre Quarterly (after 1985: New Theatre Quarterly); the journal is devoted to all epochs and styles of theatrical performance and Barker often published essays in it. The journal aimed to "provide a lively international forum where theatrical scholarship and practice can meet, and where prevailing dramatic assumptions can be subjected to vigorous critical questioning."

Together with Maggie Gale, Barker published a book about British theatre between the two World Wars. The Cambridge University Press book was to meant to reassess mid-twentieth-century British theatre cultures. Therefore the authors analyzed popular productions and even low-brow commercial success along the lines of detective plays and musical comedy. They also described development in staging historical pageantry and the trend toward politicized productions of Shakespeare.  In her review, Linda Renton called it "a vivid account not only of drama on stage, but of the perceptions and preoccupations of the audience for which these dramas were written."

Personal life 
Clive Barker had six children.

Select publications 

 Theatre games (New York: 1st edition 1977, several editions followed).
 with Maggie B. Gale: British Theatre Between the Wars, 1918–1939 (Cambridge 2007).
 Clive Barker, A Brief History of Clive Barker. New Theatre Quarterly  23.4  (2007), p. 295-303.

Links 

 Baz Kershaw, Innovative spirit at the heart of theatre studies (obituary) printed in The Guardian 19 April 2005
 Warwick University's Clive Barker Award

References 

1931 births
2005 deaths
Theatrologists
British acting coaches
Dramaturges
British male stage actors
British theatre directors
British literary editors
Academics of the University of Warwick
Academics of the University of Birmingham
Historians of theatre